Chain Gang is a 1950 American drama film directed by Lew Landers, written by Howard J. Green and starring Douglas Kennedy as a newspaper reporter who goes undercover to expose political corruption and the exploitation of chain-gang labor.

Plot 
After a state senator's bill to abolish chain gangs is rejected by the senate, reporter Cliff Roberts persuades his newspaper to allow him to go undercover as a guard in a chain-gang prison. Equipped with false employment records and a tiny microfilm camera disguised as a cigarette lighter, he tells everyone, including his girlfriend Rita McKelvey, a reporter for a rival newspaper, that he is going on a fishing trip, but actually heads for Cloverdale Prison Farm in the Deep South, where recent incidents have left three inmates dead.

The prison's Captain Duncan supplies labor in the form of chain gangs, which are ostensibly for state construction projects but in reality are exploited by Rita's stepfather, local entrepreneur John McKelvey, for his construction projects. Roberts secretly witnesses and photographs prison conditions, including the capture of an escaped inmate who is punished with an overnight stay in the sweatbox. When a convict named Snead is accused of a minor offense, Captain Duncan orders Roberts to flog Snead at the whipping post. Later, Robert visits Snead in solitary confinement to apologize for the whipping and gains Snead's trust.

Roberts' secret photographs are published in the newspaper, angering McKelvey. When an inmate sees Roberts' photograph in McKelvey's house, Roberts' cover is blown. Snead tries to escape and Roberts joins him. They try to outrun the guards and their dogs across wilderness, but Roberts is shot and left for dead by Captain Duncan, who later pins the blame on Snead. Roberts eventually reaches freedom and is reunited with Rita. Snead is killed while on the run and McKelvey is charged with the exploitation of convict labor for personal gain.

Cast

Main
 Douglas Kennedy as Cliff Roberts
 Marjorie Lord as Rita McKelvey
 Emory Parnell as Capt. Duncan
 William Phillips as Roy Snead

Supporting
 Thurston Hall as John McKelvey
 Harry Cheshire as Henry 'Pop' O'Donnell

Cameo/Uncredited

 Fred Aldrich as Convict
 Stanley Blystone as Convict on Chain Gang
 Paul E. Burns as Dr. Evans
 Benny Burt as Convict in Bunk
 Jack Chefe as Convict
 James Conaty as Pop's Influential Friend
 George Eldredge as Guard Adams
 William Fawcett as Zeke
 Eddie Foster as Convict Operating Crane
 John Hart as Chain Gang Member
 Don C. Harvey as Guard Langley
 Charles Horvath as Convict in Skirmish
 Billy Lechner as Eddie Jones
 Herbert Rawlinson as Senator Harden
 George Robotham as Guard Reagan
 John Rogers as Joe – Lunch Counterman
 Larry Steers as Senate Committee Hearing Attendee
 Bert L. Stevens as Newspaper Office Worker
 Brick Sullivan as Guard
 William Tannen as Harry Cleaver
 Dorothy Vaughan as Mrs. Briggs
 Rusty Wescoatt as Guard Yates
 Frank Wilcox as Lloyd Killgallen

Reception
Chain Gang was praised for its acting, direction, action sequences and technical qualities, but Green's improbable storyline and dialogue received criticism.

The film was reissued on DVD in 2012 as part of the Sony Choice Collection.

References

External links 
  Chain Gang at Internet Movie Database.
  Chain Gang at TCM. Last accessed June 28, 2013

1950 films
American drama films
Columbia Pictures films
Films directed by Lew Landers
1950 drama films
American black-and-white films
1950s English-language films
1950s American films